Chiginagak Volcano is a stratovolcano on the Alaska Peninsula, located about 15 km NW of Chiginagak Bay.

Eruptive history 
An unglaciated lava flow and an overlying pyroclastic-flow deposit extending east from the summit are the most recent products of Chiginagak. They most likely originated from a lava dome at 1687m on the SE flank, 1 km from the summit of the volcano. Brief ash eruptions were reported in July 1971 and August 1998. Fumarolic activity occurs at 1600m elevation on the NE flank of the volcano, and two areas of hot-spring travertine deposition are located at the NW base of the volcano near Volcano Creek.

In early May 2005, a catastrophic release of acidic water from the lake, with an accompanying acidic aerosol component, drained and flooded indecision and volcano creeks with acidic water, traveled 27 km downstream and flowed into the Mother Goose Lake, headwaters of the King Salmon River. Extensive vegetation damage occurred along the flood route and Mother Goose Lake was acidified (pH of 2.9-3.1), killing all aquatic life and preventing the annual salmon run. The lake now drains from the summit through an outlet cave into Indecision Creek. Indecision Creek now usually has a strong sulphur odor, yellow color and a pH of 1.3.

See also

List of mountain peaks in North America
List of mountain peaks in the United States
List of mountain peaks in Alaska
List of Ultras in the United States
List of volcanoes in the United States

References

Further reading

External links

 Alaska Volcano Observatory: Chiginagak
 USGS DDS-40: Volcanoes of the Alaska Peninsula and Aleutian Islands-Selected Photographs

Stratovolcanoes of the United States
Active volcanoes
Mountains of Alaska
Volcanoes of Alaska
Volcanic crater lakes
Volcanoes of Lake and Peninsula Borough, Alaska
Mountains of Lake and Peninsula Borough, Alaska
Aleutian Range
Holocene stratovolcanoes